Kentucky Route 1007 (KY 1007) is an  long state highway in the U.S. state of Kentucky. The route is located entirely within Hopkinsville and Christian County. The highway runs from KY 272 and Camilla Drive on the southwestern side of Hopkinsville to US Route 41 (US 41) north of downtown.

Route description
The highway begins at KY 272 west-southwest of downtown Hopkinsville. The road continues through the intersection as Camilla Drive. For the vast majority of its route, KY 1007 is known locally as North Drive and runs south-north on the western side of Hopkinsville, serving a mix of residential and industrial areas. Overall, the highway serves as a sort of local inner bypass on the west side of town. Near its northern terminus, the route turns onto Sanderson Drive before shortly terminating at US 41.

Major intersections

References

1007
Transportation in Christian County, Kentucky